Place Royale (meaning "Royal Square") is a square in Reims, France. A bronze statue of king Louis XV of France stands in its center, commissioned by the city from Jean-Baptiste Pigalle and inaugurated on 26 August 1765, depicting "the sovereign in Roman garb, with laurels on his head and one hand extended 'to take the people under his protection.'"

The square is a monument historique of France.

References

External links

 Place Royale 
Buildings and structures in Reims
Monuments historiques of Grand Est
Squares in France